

Barker Inlet – St Kilda Aquatic Reserve is a marine protected area in the Australian state of South Australia located in waters adjoining the east coast of Gulf St Vincent in Barker Inlet about  north of the state capital of Adelaide.  

The aquatic reserve covers the extent of the Barker Inlet located to the south of the St Kilda boat channel as well as two natural channels, the Angas Inlet and the east part of the North Arm, and land subject to tidal inundation on the east side of Torrens Island, all sides of Garden Island and in the suburbs of Gillman,  Dry Creek, Bolivar and St Kilda (from west to east).  It is bounded to its immediate north by the St Kilda – Chapman Creek Aquatic Reserve.  

It was declared on 23 August 1973 for the purpose of “conservation of mangrove seagrass communities and for the protection of nursery areas for several important commercial and recreational species, including the western king prawn, King George whiting, yellowfin whiting and blue swimmer crabs for fisheries management.”  The following activities are permitted - boating, the removal of fish by rod and line or handline and the collecting of blood worms for bait by use of a hand net.

It shares territory with the following protected and proposed protected areas - the Adelaide Dolphin Sanctuary, the Adelaide International Bird Sanctuary and the Torrens Island Conservation Park.

The aquatic reserve is classified as an IUCN Category VI protected area.

See also
Protected areas of South Australia
List of protected areas in Adelaide

References

External links
Webpage for Barker Inlet-St Kilda Aquatic Reserve on the Protected Planet website

Aquatic reserves of South Australia
Protected areas in Adelaide
Protected areas established in 1973
1973 establishments in Australia
Gulf St Vincent